Pine Beach is a borough in Ocean County, New Jersey, United States. As of the 2010 United States Census, the borough's population was 2,127, reflecting an increase of 177 (+9.1%) from the 1,950 counted in the 2000 Census, which had in turn declined by 4 (−0.2%) from the 1,954 counted in the 1990 Census. The 2010 population was the highest recorded for the borough in any decennial census.

Pine Beach was incorporated as a borough by an act of the New Jersey Legislature on February 26, 1925, from portions of Berkeley Township.

Geography

According to the United States Census Bureau, the borough had a total area of 0.64 square miles (1.66 km2), including 0.64 square miles (1.65 km2) of land and 0.01 square miles (0.01 km2) of water (0.78%).

The borough borders the Ocean County municipalities of Beachwood and Berkeley Township.

The borough is one of 11 municipalities in Ocean County that are part of the Toms River watershed.

Demographics

Census 2010

The Census Bureau's 2006–2010 American Community Survey showed that (in 2010 inflation-adjusted dollars) median household income was $75,972 (with a margin of error of +/− $10,628) and the median family income was $88,393 (+/− $8,889). Males had a median income of $58,542 (+/− $10,247) versus $40,781 (+/− $12,701) for females. The per capita income for the borough was $31,923 (+/− $3,004). About 1.9% of families and 2.7% of the population were below the poverty line, including 2.0% of those under age 18 and 7.7% of those age 65 or over.

Census 2000

As of the 2000 United States Census there were 1,950 people, 767 households, and 558 families residing in the borough. The racial makeup of the borough was 98.41% White, 0.26% African American, 0.05% Native American, 0.62% Asian, 0.21% from other races, and 0.46% from two or more races. Hispanic or Latino of any race were 2.36% of the population.

There were 767 households, out of which 30.4% had children under the age of 18 living with them, 61.8% were married couples living together, 8.1% had a female householder with no husband present, and 27.2% were non-families. 22.4% of all households were made up of individuals, and 12.1% had someone living alone who was 65 years of age or older. The average household size was 2.54 and the average family size was 3.01.

In the borough the population was spread out, with 22.7% under the age of 18, 5.7% from 18 to 24, 27.2% from 25 to 44, 27.1% from 45 to 64, and 17.3% who were 65 years of age or older. The median age was 42 years. For every 100 females, there were 93.1 males. For every 100 females age 18 and over, there were 87.7 males.

The median income for a household in the borough was $57,366, and the median income for a family was $67,404. Males had a median income of $50,256 versus $34,038 for females. The per capita income for the borough was $26,487. About 2.5% of families and 3.5% of the population were below the poverty line, including 5.0% of those under age 18 and 3.0% of those age 65 or over.

Government

Local government
Pine Beach is governed under the Borough form of New Jersey municipal government, which is used in 218 municipalities (of the 564) statewide, making it the most common form of government in New Jersey. The governing body is comprised of the Mayor and the Borough Council, with all positions elected at-large on a partisan basis as part of the November general election. The Mayor is elected directly by the voters to a four-year term of office. The Borough Council is comprised of six members elected to serve three-year terms on a staggered basis, with two seats coming up for election each year in a three-year cycle. The Borough form of government used by Pine Beach is a "weak mayor / strong council" government in which council members act as the legislative body with the mayor presiding at meetings and voting only in the event of a tie. The mayor can veto ordinances subject to an override by a two-thirds majority vote of the council. The mayor makes committee and liaison assignments for council members, and most appointments are made by the mayor with the advice and consent of the council.

, the Mayor of the Borough of Pine Beach is Republican Lawrence W. Cuneo, whose term of office ends December 31, 2023. Members of the Pine Beach Borough Council are Susan Coletti (R, 2023),  James Keesling (R, 2024), Raymond Newman (R, 2022), Richard Polhemus (R, 2023), James Saxton (R, 2024) and Barry Wieck (R, 2022).

Federal, state, and county representation
Pine Beach is located in the 4th Congressional District and is part of New Jersey's 9th state legislative district.

 

Ocean County is governed by a Board of County Commissioners comprised of five members who are elected on an at-large basis in partisan elections and serving staggered three-year terms of office, with either one or two seats coming up for election each year as part of the November general election. At an annual reorganization held in the beginning of January, the board chooses a Director and a Deputy Director from among its members. , Ocean County's Commissioners (with party affiliation, term-end year and residence) are:

Commissioner Director John P. Kelly (R, 2022, Eagleswood Township),
Commissioner Deputy Director Virginia E. Haines (R, 2022, Toms River),
Barbara Jo Crea (R, 2024, Little Egg Harbor Township)
Gary Quinn (R, 2024, Lacey Township) and
Joseph H. Vicari (R, 2023, Toms River). Constitutional officers elected on a countywide basis are 
County Clerk Scott M. Colabella (R, 2025, Barnegat Light),
Sheriff Michael G. Mastronardy (R, 2022; Toms River) and
Surrogate Jeffrey Moran (R, 2023, Beachwood).

Politics
As of March 23, 2011, there were a total of 1,609 registered voters in Pine Beach, of which 367 (22.8%) were registered as Democrats, 505 (31.4%) were registered as Republicans and 736 (45.7%) were registered as Unaffiliated. There was one voter registered to another party. Among the borough's 2010 Census population, 75.6% (vs. 63.2% in Ocean County) were registered to vote, including 97.5% of those ages 18 and over (vs. 82.6% countywide).

In the 2012 presidential election, Republican Mitt Romney received 53.2% of the vote (648 cast), ahead of Democrat Barack Obama with 45.4% (554 votes), and other candidates with 1.4% (17 votes), among the 1,225 ballots cast by the borough's 1,661 registered voters (6 ballots were spoiled), for a turnout of 73.8%. In the 2008 presidential election, Republican John McCain received 55.3% of the vote (742 cast), ahead of Democrat Barack Obama with 41.5% (557 votes) and other candidates with 2.1% (28 votes), among the 1,341 ballots cast by the borough's 1,663 registered voters, for a turnout of 80.6%. In the 2004 presidential election, Republican George W. Bush received 57.4% of the vote (737 ballots cast), outpolling Democrat John Kerry with 40.8% (523 votes) and other candidates with 1.2% (19 votes), among the 1,283 ballots cast by the borough's 1,606 registered voters, for a turnout percentage of 79.9.

In the 2013 gubernatorial election, Republican Chris Christie received 70.3% of the vote (622 cast), ahead of Democrat Barbara Buono with 27.5% (243 votes), and other candidates with 2.3% (20 votes), among the 918 ballots cast by the borough's 1,666 registered voters (33 ballots were spoiled), for a turnout of 55.1%. In the 2009 gubernatorial election, Republican Chris Christie received 63.0% of the vote (606 ballots cast), ahead of  Democrat Jon Corzine with 29.0% (279 votes), Independent Chris Daggett with 5.9% (57 votes) and other candidates with 1.1% (11 votes), among the 962 ballots cast by the borough's 1,650 registered voters, yielding a 58.3% turnout.

Education

Public school students in pre-kindergarten through twelfth grade attend the Toms River Regional Schools, a regional public school district based in Toms River Township that also includes student from the boroughs of Beachwood, Pine Beach and South Toms River, who attend as part of sending/receiving relationships. As of the 2020–2021 school year, the district, comprised of three schools, had an enrollment of 1,331 students and 153.4 classroom teachers (on an FTE basis), for a student–teacher ratio of 8.7:1. The district's board of education has nine members; seats are allocated based on population, with one seat allocated to Pine Beach.

Admiral Farragut Academy, which was established in 1933, operated until 1994, when its campus in Pine Beach was closed due to financial difficulties. The school continues to operate on an independent campus in St. Petersburg, Florida.

Transportation

Roads and highways

One side of U.S. Route 9 (Atlantic City Boulevard) travels along the borough's border with Berkeley Township.

Public transportation
NJ Transit provides bus service between the borough and Atlantic City on the 559 bus route.

Notable people

People who were born in, residents of, or otherwise closely associated with Pine Beach include:

 U. E. Baughman (1905–1978), chief of the United States Secret Service between 1948 and 1961, under Presidents Truman, Eisenhower and Kennedy
 Monique Luiz (born 1961), woman best known for starring in a famous television advertisement for Lyndon Johnson's 1964 presidential campaign known as "Daisy"
 Benjamin H. Mabie, politician who served in the New Jersey General Assembly for three terms and served as mayor of Pine Beach
 George Winterling (born 1931), retired television weatherman who was the creator of the heat index

References

External links

 Pine Beach Borough website
 Toms River Regional Schools
 
 Toms River Schools Hall of Fame
 School Data for the Toms River Regional Schools, National Center for Education Statistics

 
1925 establishments in New Jersey
Borough form of New Jersey government
Boroughs in Ocean County, New Jersey
Populated places established in 1925